Watareke Arachchilage Wiswa Warnapala (26 December 1936 – 27 February 2016) was a Sri Lankan politician, Minister of Higher Education and member of the Parliament of Sri Lanka.

References

Alumni of the University of Peradeniya
1936 births
2016 deaths
Members of the 13th Parliament of Sri Lanka
Government ministers of Sri Lanka
Sri Lanka Freedom Party politicians
United People's Freedom Alliance politicians
Sinhalese academics
Sinhalese writers
Higher education ministers of Sri Lanka